YSR Cheyutha is a program launched by the Government of Andhra Pradesh to assist women aged 45 to 60 from weaker socio-economic background by providing financial benefit of ₹75000 over the period of four years.

Development 
The scheme was launched by Chief minister of Andhra Pradesh Y. S. Jagan Mohan Reddy on 12 August 2020 with the budget of ₹17000 crores. The project covers 23 lakh women aged 45–60 belonging to BC/SC/ST/Minority castes who would get benefitted by receiving a total amount of ₹75000 over the period of four years at the rate of ₹18750 rupees per annum.  The first installment of 18750 rupees was credited into the bank accounts of 23 lakh beneficiaries on 12th Aug, 2020.Government of Andhra Pradesh has spent ₹8,943.52 crores in the first two years for the scheme and has further released ₹4,339 crore on 22 June 2021

The scheme 
YSR Cheyutha was introduced to financially assist women aged 45 to 60 from weaker social and economic sections and the government signed memoranda of understanding (MoUs) with Amul, P&G, ITC Limited, Hindustan Unilever, Allana group and Reliance Industries to develop entrepreneurship skills among women and to provide technical and marketing support in the areas of production and marketing. Women opting production sector are trained by the companies and the products produced by them are bought back. Whereas the women opting to marketing sector are given a choice to purchase the products of their choice at marginal rate which could be sold in retail sector with profits.

References 

2020 establishments in Andhra Pradesh
Government welfare schemes in Andhra Pradesh